Dah (or Dha, Da) is a panchayat village in the Leh district of Ladakh, India. It is  the most prominent of all the Brokpa settlements, other than Dah, it has  five hamlets: Biama, Baldes, Sannit, Pardos, and Lastyang.  It is located in lower Indus valley of Ladakh in the Khalsi tehsil.

Geography
Dah village is a frontier part of Ladakh,located on the right bank of the Indus River in Ladakh. It is in on the left side of lower valley of the Dah stream that flows from the Yaldor nullah to drain into the Indus Tiver. The Yaldor nullah gets its water from two mountain streams, one from the north-west (Yaldor West or Gragrio Nullah) and one from the north-east (Yaldor East or Junk Lungnal), which meet in a Y shapr at Yaldor village.

Lastyang is a small tributary valley located north of the Indus and northeast of Dha. Baldes is a small pasture valley located on the Baldes stream, across from Lastyang, on the left bank of the Indus River.

Biama (also known as Phunder) is located between Hanu and Dah, at a river junction where the Heniskot stream meets the Danjak. Sannit is a small side valley located north of the Indus and northeast of Dah.

The village and its hamlets are built into the side of a high mountain wall on a slope above the fields. The alleys are used as irrigation canals, with water flowing into the fields on a regular basis. The hamlets are sparsely populated. There are five snowmelt nallah, and a river that serves as a water source.They are located between or near cultivated fields strewn with fruit trees, which are especially concentrated near the stream and water canals. All of the residents of these hamlets have ancestral homes in the Dah village.

Traveling up the Dah stream, there are several summer habitations, which the inhibitants of Dha occupy for a short time or longer depending on their elevation. While descending, the first areas to appear are Dunder, Cilgiadi, and Cumavcings, which has cultivated fields. The valley stretching along the Dah stream to its source is a large area. In ancient times, this area was the Minaro summer pasture Nirda. The Nirda pasture is a lovely location. Brokpa worship a large juniper tree festooned with prayer flags as Chilligi Deuha, a shrine (juniper shrine).

Flora and fauna 
Dah village is located on a narrow, extremely green ledge above the otherwise barren Indus River gorge. It has dense vegetation with a wide range of herbs, shrubs, and trees such as shukpa, stagpa, umbu, seva, skyrepa, spenme, kangtakari, askuta, garma, yuled, and kumout. The foliage is dense, and light filters through the grapevine and tree lattice. The houses are dispersed and surrounded by farmland. Apricots, walnuts, willows, and poplars are a plenty in the area.

Demographics 
The inhabitants of these village are Buddhist Dards known to outsiders as Brokpa, speaking Brokskat language.According to the 2011 census of India, Dah has 103 households. The effective literacy rate (i.e. the literacy rate of population excluding children aged 6 and below) is 58.95%.

See also
Aryan valley
Hanoo
Garkon
Darchik
Chulichan

References

External links
 Jitaditya Narzary, Into The Brokpa Country: Dah, Hanu, & Beama, Travelling Slacker (blog), 27 October 2018.
 Jitaditya Narzary, Dah Village: The Citadel of Brokpas, Travelling Slacker (blog), 14 January 2019.

Villages in Khalsi tehsil